HNLMS Van Speijk (F828) is the eighth and last ship in the  of multi-purpose frigates, used by the Royal Netherlands Navy.

History
Van Speijk was laid down at Schelde Naval Shipbuilding, Vlissingen on 1 October 1991, launched 26 March 1994, and commissioned 7 September 1995.

Starting in 2010 this ship underwent an upgrade program (called 'IPM') and was fitted with new mast section with new sensors like: Seastar (small target radar system) and Gatekeeper, a new combat computer system (Linux based), new computer networks, communication equipment, enlarged helicopter deck to allow the NH90 helicopter to land and many other changes. The biggest visual change is the new, bigger mast custom built by the Navy's maintenance establishment the 'Marinebedrijf'. HNLMS Van Speijk was the first of four ships to get this update, from both Belgian and Dutch Navy. A new towed sonar will be fitted next few years in a new large maintenance period, to replace the older TACTAS towed array system .

She is the seventh ship in the Royal Netherlands Navy to be named after Jan van Speijk, who, during the Belgian Revolution, blew up his ship rather than let it fall into Belgian hands. To honor him the Dutch king decided the Royal Netherlands Navy will always have a ship named after him.

Activities
On 22 December 2017 HNLMS Van Speijk, during its term as stationed ship in the Caribbean part of the Netherlands, intercepted drug smugglers trying to smuggle  of cocaine. On New Year's Eve (2017–2018)  Van Speijk intercepted  of cocaine during an operation in the Caribbean region.

Laid up 
HNLMS Van Speijk was laid up from summer 2021 due to staff shortage.

References

Works cited

General references

External links
 homepage of Zr. Ms. Van Speijk (in Dutch)

1994 ships
Karel Doorman-class frigates
Frigates of the Netherlands